Polonia Triangle, also known as the Polish Triangle, is located in West Town, in what had been the historical Polish Downtown area of Chicago.  A single-tiered fountain  made of black iron with a bowl about nine feet in diameter is installed at its center. Polonia Triangle derives its name from the Polish word Polonia, which means 'Polish diaspora'. Polonia Triangle was considered to be the center or town square of Chicago's Polish Downtown, the city's oldest and most prominent Polish settlement. In many ways it functioned as the capital of the American Polonia with the headquarters for almost every major Polish organization in the United States clustered within its vicinity. 

It is bound by Division, Ashland and Milwaukee Avenue. 
Organisations located within its vicinity include the Polish National Alliance to the Polish Daily News. Polonia Triangle is one of 11 neighborhoods included in The Labor Trail which chronicles Chicago's history of working class life and struggle. The site is still home to the Chopin Theatre and is used for processions during Corpus Christi by parishioners of two of Chicago's Polish Cathedrals: St. Stanislaus Kostka and Holy Trinity Polish Mission.

The Blue Line's Division/Milwaukee station is also located at the Polonia Triangle.

Controversies

There have been two major controversies relating to Polonia Triangle. 

The first dealt with renaming the plaza after writer Nelson Algren (1909–1981), whose controversial 1940s novels prominently displayed the Polish American underclass and was taken by Chicago's Polish community as Anti-Polonism. A compromise was reached in 1998, where the Triangle kept its name and a newly installed fountain was named after Algren and inscribed with a quote from his 1951 essay Chicago: City on the Make around the fountain's base: "For the masses who do the city's labor also keep the city's heart".

The second more recent one has been a push by a number of area residents led by Zygmunt Dyrkacz, head of the Chopin Theatre, to artistically redevelop the Triangle as "the gateway to Wicker Park".

Redevelopment

Although Polonia Triangle has deteriorated from its heady days as the center of Polish Downtown, the entire West Town area has undergone a renaissance as gentrification has transformed the area. The old "Polish Broadway" along Division Street is becoming an increasingly thriving business district, full of nightclubs, restaurants and cafes. These changes have accelerated calls to improve what had become a long neglected area, most recently publicized in the Chicago Reader's in depth report titled "Wicker Park's Dirty Doorstep: Round two of the battle over the glorified bus stop known as the Polish Triangle".

Additionally, the Metropolitan Planning Council along with the Placemaking Movement and WPB (Wicker Park/Bucktown) have jointly undertaken an initiative to redevelop and renovate Polonia Triangle.

References

External links
The Metropolitan Planning Council and the Placemaking Movement's joint initiative to redevelop and renovate Polonia Triangle

Polish-American culture in Chicago
West Side, Chicago
History of Chicago
Polish communities in the United States